Water Pipe railway station is a railway station on the  – Matheran railway line of the Matheran Hill Railway. It is named so for its proximity to water pipes.

References

Railway stations in Raigad district
Mountain railways in India